Monty J. Bennett (born ) is an American businessman who founded and is the chairman and CEO of Ashford Inc., a hospitality real estate company.

Early life and education 

Bennett grew up in Houston, Texas, as one of seven children. His father, Archie Bennett Jr., was also a hospitality executive. He earned a Bachelor of Science degree from the Cornell University School of Hotel Administration in 1988, and a Master of Business Administration from Cornell University's Samuel Curtis Johnson Graduate School of Management in 1989.

Career 
In 1989, Bennett co-founded and joined Remington Hotels, a hotel company co-owned by his father. He grew the business from six hotels to over 130 by 2020, including Braemar real estate investment trust which operates 13 resort properties. He was CEO of Braemar Hotels & Resorts until 2016 and since 2013 has remained its chairman. He is also the founder of Ashford, a company that advises both Braemar Hotels & Resorts and Ashford Hospitality Trust, two publicly traded real estate investment trusts. Bennett was the CEO of Ashford Hospitality Trust from its founding until 2017, and he remains the firm's chairman.

In 2020, a number of large companies were criticized for receiving funds distributed through the Paycheck Protection Program (PPP). Bennett's Ashford company received $56 million, the largest such distribution. The money was returned after the company received backlash. Ashford laid off or furloughed 95% of its 7,000 workers by late March 2020. Bennett forfeited 25% of his 2019 earned bonus, took a 20% cut in salary which he later took in stock only. During this period, Ashford Trust designated 25 properties as "lodging for first responders, healthcare workers, and others affected by the pandemic".

Political involvement 

Bennett has been a donor to the Republican Party, donating more than $1.1million to Donald Trump's presidential campaigns and to the Republican National Committee between the 2016 election and May 2020. , Bennett was on the advisory board of Texans for Education Reform.

In October 2020, The New York Times reported that Bennett had pitched a media network run by Brian Timpone to publish articles about topics ranging from COVID-19 stimulus legislation to U.S.–China policy. In February 2021, Bennett announced his acquisition of the website Dallas Express (unrelated to the former African American newspaper of the same name), which was identified by D Magazine as having previously been part of Timpone's Metric Media network. In a March 2023 report, The Texas Observer found that the Dallas Express was being used to promote a network of pro-police and anti-LGBT astroturfing groups.

Personal life 
Bennett is married and has four children—two from a previous marriage, and two stepchildren. He lives in Dallas, where he has lived for more than 30 years. He also owns a 1,500-acre ranch in Athens, Texas, a portion of which has been in his family for three generations.

In 2014, he won an out-of-court settlement against the Tarrant Regional Water District to divert a pipeline from running across his property, having created a conservation district on his land and brought endangered animals to live on the land, amongst other exotic animals he already had.

References

External links
"Hotel M&A becomes hot property for Chinese investors" – Bloomberg Markets video (2016)

1960s births
Living people
20th-century American businesspeople
21st-century American businesspeople
21st-century American newspaper publishers (people)
American hoteliers
American real estate businesspeople
Businesspeople from Dallas
Businesspeople from Houston
Cornell University alumni